Luigi de Bettin was an Italian bobsledder who competed during the 1960s. He won the silver medal in the four-man event at the 1963 FIBT World Championships in Igls.

References
Bobsleigh four-man world championship medalists since 1930

Italian male bobsledders
Possibly living people
Year of birth missing (living people)